Miriam Elizabeth Rodríguez Martínez (5 February 1960 – 10 May 2017) was a Mexican human rights activist. She became one of the many "Missing Child Parents", (a class of victims of organized crime, labeled as such by local news media) after her daughter was abducted and killed. Miriam was shot 12 times by gunmen in front of her house and died on 10 May 2017.

Life 
Miriam Elizabeth Rodríguez Martínez was born on 5 February 1960 in San Fernando in the Mexican state of Tamaulipas. Her daughter, Karen Alejandra Salinas Rodríguez, disappeared in 2012. Karen's remains were eventually discovered in 2014. Rodríguez pursued her daughter’s killers for years. Some of the men arrested for her daughter's case have escaped prison after their arrest. Along with finding her daughter, she was making efforts to help other parents whose children had disappeared, and from it came the Colectivo de Desaparecidos (The Vanished Collective) organization.

Rodríguez was killed on 10 May 2017, the day Mexico celebrates Mother's Day. She was shot 12 times by gunmen who broke into her home, and died on her way to the hospital. In solidarity with her, protesters raised their voices in protest the day she was killed, calling on the Mexican and U.S. governments to ensure the safety of human rights defenders.

References 

2017 murders in Mexico
2017 deaths
History of Tamaulipas
Mexican human rights activists
Women human rights activists
Mexican humanitarians
Women humanitarians
People from Tamaulipas
Unsolved murders in Mexico
1967 births
Femicide in Mexico